The Belluno Treasure is an important Lombardic hoard found at Belluno, Italy in the nineteenth century that has been part of the British Museum's collection since 1897.

Discovery
The hoard was apparently found in a grave near the town of Belluno in the region of Veneto, northern Italy. Dating to the late 6th or early 7th centuries AD, the rich grave group probably belonged to a female member of the Lombardic court. It was later purchased by the curator and philanthropist Augustus Franks, who bequeathed it to the British Museum in 1897.

Description
The Belluno Treasure is largely composed of gold and gem-encrusted jewellery. The style of decoration from the hoard reflect contemporary fashions in the Mediterranean. It includes two gold cross pendants (one with punched ornamentation), a  gold and garnet cloisonné disc brooch, a finger-ring, a gold pin with a terminus in the form of a hand (which may have once held a pearl), and gold beads.

Gallery

See also
Artres Treasure
Domagnano Treasure
Sutri Treasure
Bergamo Treasure

References

Further reading
S. Marzinzik, Masterpieces: Early Medieval Art (London, British Museum Press, 2013)
N. Christie, The Lombards (Oxford, Blackwell, 1995)
A. Castagnetti and G.M. Varanini (eds.), Il Veneto nel medioevo. Dalla (Verona, Banco Popolare di Verona, 1989)

Medieval European objects in the British Museum
Medieval European metalwork objects
Treasure troves of Italy
Italy–United Kingdom relations